Traditionally, Olympic coins are numismatic coins. However, several host countries minted so many coins – particularly silver ones – that their value has become just slightly above the value of their metal content. Coins for the 1976 Montreal, 1984 Los Angeles, and 1988 Seoul are generally considered to fall into that category.

There have been cases, though, in which host countries minted circulating commemorative coins. For example, Canada's Lucky Loonie program and its 2007 25-cent pieces to commemorate the 2010 Vancouver Olympic Games, and Brazil's 1-real pieces that commemorate the 2014 Rio de Janeiro Olympic Games.

Summer Games

2000 Sydney Olympics
This set has been very popular with collectors, with people still trying to get hold of a complete set. The first coin in this set was sold out at the mint very quickly and it has left a lot of people with incomplete sets.

Olympic Gold Proof Coin Collection
 The eight gold coins of the collection depict the athlete's journey from the inspiration of the Games logo, through dedication to the task, preparation for the event and final achievement. The coins have been released progressively from October 1997 to February 2000. The worldwide mintage of gold coins is limited to only 30,000 per design.
 All the gold coins carry the 'P' mintmark of The Perth Mint and bear the year 2000, making them the first coins of the year 2000. Colour is used on selected gold coin designs - another first for Australian and official Olympic Games coins. Each coin is accompanied by a serial-numbered certificate of authenticity and is presented in a green presentation case.

$5 Silver Proof Coin Collection
 The silver coins depict the wider role of the Sydney 2000 Olympic Games as a symbol of peace and cultural harmony, and the uniqueness of Australia's environment. The Sydney 2000 Olympic Silver Coin Collection consists of 16 proof quality coins that have been released two at a time between October 1997 and February 2000.
 One coin in each release reflects the coming together of peoples and ideas in our culturally diverse nation, as expressed in the four great festivals being celebrated in Sydney leading up to the Olympic Games. The other coin highlights the environmental richness of the Australian continent. Each coin bears the mintmark of the Mint producing the coin.
 The 2000 Olympic Silver set comprises sixteen coins struck in 99.9% pure silver. These coins were designed to represent both Australia's cultural history and environment. The silver set is available in the complete set of sixteen coins, or individually.

Specifications

Coin Details

Olympic Kilogram Coin
At the time, the 1 Kilo Proof coin was the largest Olympic coin released. All 28 sports were depicted on this pure silver (.999%) coin. It was packaged in a Jarrah box, complete with a serial numbered Certificate of Authenticity. With only 20,000 minted, it was a very popular coin.

$5 Bronze Collection
This release for the Sydney 2000 Bronze Olympic coins has
28 coins in the complete set. Each individual coin displays one of the 28 sports which were played at the games. The coins were sold individually or in a complete set.

Olymphilex Uncirculated Dollar
The Royal Australian Mint released this coin in commemoration of the Olymphilex exhibition held in Sydney whilst the 2000 Olympic Games were on.  The Coin has edged lettering with the word Sydney displayed on it. The coin is available with Canberra and Sydney edged on the coin.

Paralympic Games Victory Silver Dollar Coin
This Sydney 2000 Paralympic Commemorative coin released by the Royal Australian Mint depicts the medals which were awarded to the winning Paralympians. The coin displays the Paralympic logo and is struck strictly to demand from orders placed before the closing of the Paralympic games.  These releases were the IOC's first Victory Medals on legal tender.

Paralympic Games Victory 10oz Silver Proof Coin
The 10oz coin symbolizes Paralympic remembrance, featuring the design of the Sydney Harbour Bridge and the Opera House as its centrepiece. This coin is struck from 99.9% fine silver in proof quality and is presented in a teak timber case together with a certificate of authenticity. The coin had a mintage of 3,000.
.

Paralympic Games Gold, Silver and Bronze Coins
Gold, Silver and Bronze coins were released to commemorate the Sydney 2000 Paralympic Games. The Silver and Bronze coins are legal tender and have a face value of $5.

2004 Athens Olympics
2 Euro base metal circulating coin
10 Euro Silver
100 Euro Gold
12 Coin Silver Set
6 Coin Gold Set
6 Coin Set (4 Silver, 2 Gold)

2008 Beijing Olympics

1 Yuan

10 Yuan

150 Yuan

300 Yuan

2,000 Yuan

100,000 Yuan

2007
 Four Proof 1-ounce .999 silver 10-yuan coins (to be determined)
 Two Proof third-ounce .9999 fine gold 150-yuan coins (to be determined)
 Five ounce Gold Coin
 One kilogram Silver Coin
 Two circulation coins (to be determined)

2008
 Five ounce Gold Coin
 One kilogram Silver Coin
 Two circulation coins (to be determined)

2012 London Olympics

50p sports collection

Olympic Games Handover Ceremony - £2

2016 Rio de Janeiro Olympics
The Central Bank of Brazil has released a few commemorative coins celebrating the 2016 Summer Olympics. To commemorate the handover of the Olympic flag, a R$1 coin was released in 2012.

Throughout 2016, sixteen different R$1 coin designs were released, representing a variety of sports practiced during the Olympics.

Additionally, non-circulating coins with non-standard values (namely, R$5 and R$10) were also released as proof mintings.

2020 Tokyo Olympics

100 Yen

500 Yen

1,000 Yen

10,000 Yen

Euro coins

Several countries in the eurozone are minting high value euro collectors' coin celebrating this occasion, like the recent 2008 Olympic Games commemorative coin, minted in June 2008. The obverse carries on the right side a symbol of the Belgian Olympic Committee, in the center an analog of the Olympic flambeau, which will constantly burn during the Olympic Games, and on the left side symbols of the Olympic disciplines: cycling, hockey, athletics and tennis can be seen.

References

Olympics, Modern
Coins, Modern
Olympic commemorative coins